Alex Michael Caruso (born February 28, 1994) is an American professional basketball player for the Chicago Bulls of the National Basketball Association (NBA). Nicknamed "Bald Mamba" or "Carushow", he played college basketball for the Texas A&M Aggies, earning second-team all-Southeastern Conference (SEC) honors as a senior in 2016. He won an NBA championship with the Los Angeles Lakers in 2020.

High school career
Caruso attended A&M Consolidated High School in his native College Station, Texas, where he played basketball under head coaches Rusty Segler and Rick German. As a senior, he averaged 18 points and nine rebounds and was named TABC All-Regional, All-State as well as TABC All-Star and district MVP after leading his team to the postseason.

College career

After graduating from high school, Caruso joined the Texas A&M Aggies. In 137 games over his four-year career, he averaged 8.0 points, 4.7 assists and 2.02 steals per game, finishing as the school's all-time leader in assists with 649 and steals with 276, surpassing David Edwards in those categories. As a senior he led the Aggies to the Sweet 16 of the NCAA Tournament; he also earned SEC All-Defensive Team and second-team All-SEC honors.

Professional career

Oklahoma City Blue (2016–2017)
After going undrafted in the 2016 NBA draft, Caruso joined the Philadelphia 76ers for the 2016 NBA Summer League. On September 23, 2016, he signed with the Oklahoma City Thunder, but was later waived on October 17. On November 3, he was acquired by the Oklahoma City Blue of the NBA Development League.

Los Angeles Lakers (2017–2021)
Caruso joined the Lakers for the 2017 NBA Summer League. After several productive games, including one in which Caruso started in place of the injured Lonzo Ball and led the Lakers to a victory, he was signed to the Lakers' first two-way contract on July 13, 2017. He became the first player to go directly from the D-League (now G League) to the NBA via two-way contract. He also helped lead the Lakers win the 2017 NBA Summer League Championship in Las Vegas. Caruso made his NBA debut on October 19, 2017, against the Los Angeles Clippers. He played 12 minutes and recorded two points, two assists, and one rebound in a 108–92 loss. He had a career-high 15 points and seven rebounds in a victory in the final game of the season against the Clippers.

Caruso signed another two-way contract with the Los Angeles Lakers after a successful showing in the 2018 NBA Summer League. On March 6, 2019, he recorded a season-high 15 points, six rebounds, and three assists in a 99–115 loss to the Denver Nuggets. He scored a new career-high 32 points in a 122–117 victory over the Clippers on April 5. He also became the only Laker that season other than LeBron James to record a 30+ point, 10+ rebound, 5+ assist game. On April 7, 2019, with the Lakers missing James for the remaining six games, Caruso scored 18 points with a career-high 11 assists in a 113–109 home win over the Utah Jazz.

On July 6, 2019, Caruso signed a two-year contract with the Lakers worth $5.5 million. He won his first NBA championship with them on October 11, 2020, when the Lakers defeated the Miami Heat in six games. Caruso started the clinching game of the NBA Finals. He became an unrestricted free agent after the 2020–21 season.

Chicago Bulls (2021–present)
On August 10, 2021, Caruso signed a four-year, $37 million contract with the Chicago Bulls.

On January 21, 2022, during a 90–94 loss to the Milwaukee Bucks, Caruso was fouled by opposing guard Grayson Allen. Allen was ejected from the game. The next day, the Bulls announced that Caruso had a fractured right wrist and would undergo surgery, keeping him out for at least 6-to-8 weeks.

Career statistics

NBA

Regular season

|-
| style="text-align:left;"|
| style="text-align:left;"|L.A. Lakers
| 37 || 7 || 15.2 || .431 || .302 || .700 || 1.8 || 2.0 || .6 || .3 || 3.6
|-
| style="text-align:left;"|
| style="text-align:left;"|L.A. Lakers
| 25 || 4 || 21.2 || .445 || .480 || .797 || 2.7 || 3.1 || 1.0 || .4 || 9.2
|-
| style="text-align:left; background:#afe6ba;"|
| style="text-align:left;"|L.A. Lakers
| 64 || 2 || 18.4 || .412 || .333 || .737 || 1.9 || 1.9 || 1.1 || .3 || 5.5
|-
| style="text-align:left;"|
| style="text-align:left;"|L.A. Lakers
| 58 || 6 || 21.0 || .436 || .401 || .645 || 2.9 || 2.8 || 1.1 || .3 || 6.4
|-
| style="text-align:left;"|
| style="text-align:left;"|Chicago
| 41 || 18 || 28.0 || .398 || .333 || .795 || 3.6 || 4.0 || 1.7 || .4 || 7.4
|- class="sortbottom"
| style="text-align:center;" colspan="2"|Career
| 225 || 37 || 20.6 || .422 || .366 || .736 || 2.5 || 2.7 || 1.1 || .3 || 6.2

Playoffs

|-
| style="text-align:left; background:#afe6ba;"| 2020
| style="text-align:left;"| L.A. Lakers
| style="background:#cfecec;"|  21* || 1 || 24.3 || .425 || .279 || .800 || 2.3 || 2.8 || 1.1 || .6 || 6.5
|-
| style="text-align:left;"| 2021
| style="text-align:left;"|L.A. Lakers
| 6 || 0 || 20.2 || .368 || .294 || 1.000 || 1.3 || .5 || .2 || .7 || 5.8
|-
| style="text-align:left;"| 2022
| style="text-align:left;"| Chicago
| 4 || 4 || 28.3 || .391 || .389 || – || 2.8 || 4.3 || 1.3 || 1.0 || 6.3
|- class="sortbottom"
| style="text-align:center;" colspan="2"|Career
| 31 || 5 || 24.0 || .408 || .302 || .813 || 2.2 || 2.5 || .9 || .6 || 6.4

College

|-
| style="text-align:left;"|2012–13
| style="text-align:left;"|Texas A&M
|| 33 || 17 || 24.7 || .373 || .265 || .600 || 3.2 || 3.4 || 1.8 || .5 || 5.5
|-
| style="text-align:left;"|2013–14 
| style="text-align:left;"|Texas A&M
|| 34 || 33 || 29.8 || .460 || .333 || .685 || 3.6 || 5.0 || 2.0 || .8 || 9.0
|-
| style="text-align:left;"|2014–15 
| style="text-align:left;"|Texas A&M 
|| 33 || 33 || 31.5 || .463 || .366 || .685 || 4.5 || 5.5 || 2.1 || .2 || 9.1
|-
| style="text-align:left;"|2015–16
| style="text-align:left;"|Texas A&M
|| 37 || 37 || 28.8 || .502 || .368 || .785 || 3.6 || 5.0 || 2.1 || .2 || 8.1
|- class="sortbottom"
| style="text-align:center;" colspan="2"|Career
|| 137 || 120 || 28.7 || .455 || .340 || .685 || 3.7 || 4.7 || 2.0 || .4 || 8.0

Personal life
Caruso has two sisters. His father played four years at Creighton and was an associate athletic director at Texas A&M.

Caruso grew up around the A&M program, spending many seasons as a ball boy for the Aggies. While studying at Texas A&M he majored in sports management.

On June 22, 2021, he was arrested at Easterwood Airport in College Station, Texas, for residual marijuana left on a grinder.

References

External links

 
 Texas A&M Aggies bio

1994 births
Living people
American men's basketball players
Basketball players from Texas
Chicago Bulls players
Point guards
Los Angeles Lakers players
Oklahoma City Blue players
People from College Station, Texas
South Bay Lakers players
Texas A&M Aggies men's basketball players
Undrafted National Basketball Association players
United States men's national basketball team players